Sociedad Deportiva Reocín is a football team based in Reocín in the autonomous community of Cantabria. Founded in 1964, the team plays in Regional Preferente. The club's home ground is Pepín Cadelo, which has a capacity of 4,000 spectators.

History
The club retired from competition on 2010, 11 December due to economic reasons. The team are expected to play next season on Regional Preferente de Cantabria.

Women's team

Season to season

14 seasons in Tercera División

References

Football clubs in Cantabria
Association football clubs established in 1964
Divisiones Regionales de Fútbol clubs
1964 establishments in Spain